Corson is a surname. Notable people with the surname include:

 Dale Corson (born 1914), American physicist and academic administrator
 Dan Corson (born 1964), American artist
 Fred Pierce Corson (1896–1985), American Methodist bishop
 George Corson (1829–1910), British architect
 James Corson (1906–1981), American discus thrower
 Juliet Corson (1841–1897), leader in cookery education
 Harvey Corson, American academic administrator
 Hiram Corson (1828–1911), American professor of literature
 Samuel Corson (1909-1990), American psychiatrist
 Shayne Corson (born 1966), Canadian hockey player